Ernst William Gilbert O'Regan (23 January 1907 – 22 August 1996) was an Australian rules footballer who played with Carlton in the Victorian Football League (VFL).

Notes

External links 

Ern O'Regan's profile at Blueseum
 

1907 births
1996 deaths
Carlton Football Club players
Port Adelaide Football Club (SANFL) players
Port Adelaide Football Club players (all competitions)
Australian rules footballers from South Australia